Kastor Notter (16 February 1903 – 9 January 1950) was a Swiss racing cyclist. He was the Swiss National Road Race champion in 1924, 1925 and 1927. He finished in fifth place in the 1926 Paris–Roubaix.

References

External links
 

1903 births
1950 deaths
People from Baden District, Aargau
Swiss male cyclists
Sportspeople from Aargau